Killshot is a 2008 American thriller film directed by John Madden and starring Diane Lane, Thomas Jane, Mickey Rourke and Joseph Gordon-Levitt. It is based on Elmore Leonard's 1989 novel of the same name. The story follows a couple who, despite being in a Witness Protection Program, are being chased and confronted by the criminal they outed.

Plot
Armand Degas, a hitman known as "Blackbird", accidentally shoots his younger brother during a job. Years later, he is hired by a Mafia boss to assassinate the man's father-in-law at a hotel, but also kills a witness. Visiting Walpole Island, Blackbird crosses paths with Lionel, a fellow First Nations member, and notices Wayne Colson, a recently fired ironworker. Separated from his wife Carmen, Wayne collects some belongings from their house in Michigan.

Unable to collect his payment for the hotel murder, Blackbird learns the Mafia boss wants him dead for needlessly killing the witness. He meets Richie Nix, a volatile young criminal, and joins his scheme to extort Carmen's boss, Nelson Davies. Visiting Carmen's office to ask for a job, Wayne is mistaken for Davies by Richie and Blackbird. Richie demands the money at gunpoint, but Wayne fends them off, throwing Richie out a window. As Wayne and Carmen see Blackbird's face before he escapes with Richie, he vows to kill them.
 	
Blackbird recognizes Wayne from Walpole Island, where he and Richie press Lionel for Wayne's whereabouts before killing him. Staying at the home of Richie's girlfriend Donna, Blackbird and Richie arrive at the Colsons' house just as Wayne drives off. Richie takes off after him, and Carmen confronts Blackbird with Wayne's shotgun before locking herself inside and calling the police. Richie shoots at Wayne inside a convenience store but he escapes, and Richie kills the clerk. In the morning, the Colsons learn about Blackbird from the FBI and are placed in Witness Protection.
 	
Richie tricks Carmen's mother into revealing the Colsons have moved to Missouri. Carmen suspects the FBI is using them as bait to find the killers, but reconnects with Wayne in their new life together. Blackbird coerces the Mafia boss into digging up his brother's body and burning it in a car with another corpse to fake Blackbird and Richie's deaths. DNA from the body is tested against Blackbird's other incarcerated brother, proving they are related. With the FBI convinced the killers are dead, Wayne and Carmen are allowed to return home. Jealous of Donna's advances toward Blackbird, Richie shoots her before they leave to kill the Colsons.

After admitting to Wayne that she is not sure their marriage will survive, Carmen returns home alone, finding Richie and Blackbird waiting. Richie torments Carmen, spraying her with buck lure, forcing her to stay in her underwear, and putting a bullet in her mouth which she spits onto the floor. Losing his patience after Richie antagonizes him about Donna, Blackbird shoots Richie dead. Emptying Richie's pistol, he allows Carmen upstairs to get dressed. She finds another of Wayne's shotguns, but Blackbird disarms her.
 
Wayne arrives, and realizes Carmen is being held hostage. He retrieves his shotgun from his truck as Blackbird bursts outside. They exchange fire and Wayne is hit, losing his gun. As Blackbird moves in for the killshot, he turns to see Carmen aiming Richie's gun, which he reminds her is empty, but remembers the bullet she spat out earlier. While Blackbird is distracted, Wayne crawls to his shotgun, and he and Carmen shoot Blackbird at the same time. Blackbird falls dead, as Carmen and Wayne embrace.

Cast
 Diane Lane as Carmen Colson
 Thomas Jane as Wayne Colson
 Mickey Rourke as Armand "The Blackbird" Degas
 Joseph Gordon-Levitt as Richie Nix
 Rosario Dawson as Donna
 Hal Holbrook as "Papa"
 Don McManus as Nelson Davies
 Lois Smith as Lenore

Production

Development and writing
The film adaptation of the 1989 novel Killshot by Elmore Leonard began development as early as May 1997 under Miramax Films, which had optioned Leonard's novel. By September 2004, the adaptation entered active development, with director John Madden expressing interest in helming. By January 2005, The Weinstein Company hired Madden to direct the film based on a script by Hossein Amini.

Casting
The following August, actors Diane Lane, Thomas Jane, and Mickey Rourke were cast in the lead roles. In September, actors Rosario Dawson, Joseph Gordon-Levitt, and Johnny Knoxville were cast. Actress Sandra Bullock was originally considered for the role taken by Lane, while John Travolta, Viggo Mortensen, and Justin Timberlake were originally reported to have been up for the roles taken by Rourke, Jane, and Gordon-Levitt, respectively.

Filming
Principal photography began in October 2005 in Toronto, Ontario. Filming also took place in Cape Girardeau along the Mississippi River. Production concluded by December 2005.

Post-production
By July 2006, Killshot was being screened to test audiences who had previously enjoyed Traffic and Collateral. Test screenings showed that audiences found the plot too confusing and that the story was not tightened enough. As a result, scenes involving Cape Girardeau and a subplot involving Johnny Knoxville's role as a deputy were edited from the film.

Release

Theatrical
Killshot was originally slated to be released on March 17, 2006. It then was delayed to October 20, 2006.

Home media
It was reported on July 19, 2008, that Killshot would be going straight to DVD. In early September 2008, the film was resurrected for November 7, 2008, but then pushed back to January 23, 2009. The film was released on DVD on May 26, 2009, and Blu-ray on February 22, 2011.

Reception

Critical response
The film received mixed reviews. , it holds a 33% approval rating on Rotten Tomatoes, based on six reviews with an average rating of 4.92 out of 10.

References

External links
 
 

2008 films
2008 crime thriller films
2008 independent films
American crime thriller films
American independent films
Films about witness protection
Films based on American novels
Films based on works by Elmore Leonard
Films directed by John Madden
Films produced by Lawrence Bender
Films scored by Klaus Badelt
Films shot in Michigan
Films shot in Missouri
Films shot in Toronto
Films with screenplays by Hossein Amini
2000s English-language films
2000s American films